Relations between the neighboring countries of Iran and the United Arab Emirates (UAE) are deeply historic, dating back centuries prior to the establishment of the modern-day United Arab Emirates; however today are shaky and unpredictable. Both the countries maintain diplomatic relations with each other, having embassies in each other's capitals.

There is a significant community of Iranians in the United Arab Emirates, mostly residing in the emirate of Dubai. An Arabic-speaking native community lives in the southern provinces of Iran, some of whose members share historical ties with the southern shores of the Persian Gulf. Throughout history, various Persian and Arab Empires included lands which comprises today's Iran and UAE.

History
In recent decades, there have been tensions over three islands in the Persian Gulf: Abu Musa, Greater Tunb, Lesser Tunb. Both the UAE and Iran have maintained that they are trying to find a solution to this issue according to the rules of international law.

Outstanding conflicts are:
 UAE challenges Iran's sovereignty over two islands in the Persian Gulf while Iran considers them as its inseparable parts: Lesser Tunb (called Tunb-al-Sughra in Arabic and Tonb-e-Kuchak in Persian) and Greater Tunb (called Tunb-al-Kubra in Arabic and Tonb-e-Bozorg in Persian). The islands have been in Iran's control since November 1971, following the departure of British forces from the Persian Gulf, and a few days before UAE's declaration of independence in December 1971.   
 UAE has disputed Iran's sovereignty over Abu Musa, an island in the Persian Gulf that was agreed in a 1971 memorandum of understanding to be jointly administered with Iran for civil matters in the southern part of the island (called Jazirat-Abu-Musa in Arabic and Jazireh-ye-Abu-Musa in Persian). The island was under Iranian control until Britain gained control in 1908. In the late 1960s, Britain transferred administration of the island to the British-appointed Sharjah sheikhdom, one of the seven sheikdoms that would later form the UAE. On November 30, 1971 (two days before the official establishment of UAE), Iran and Sharjah signed a memorandum of understanding to jointly administer a part of the island based on a map annexed to the memorandum, allowing Iran to station military forces and the Sharjah sheikhdom to maintain a limited number of police in the island. However, Iran has taken steps to exert unilateral control since 1992, including access restrictions and a military build-up on the island, as well as expelling the foreign workers who operated the UAE-sponsored school, medical clinic, and power-generating station.
 Iran has criticized the UAE for allowing France to develop its first permanent base in the Persian Gulf and generally considers the UAE's permission for stationing the western powers' military forces in the region as a threat to its national security.
 UAE Football League's name change has been viewed as a revival of the Persian Gulf naming dispute.
 UAE demonstrates political support for Saudi Arabia, Iran's rival. The Government of Iran claims that UAE and Saudi Arabia collaborate with each other in attempt to destabilize Iran.

On November 28, 2013, the foreign minister of the UAE visited Iran. In late July 2019, an Emirati delegation of coast guard commanders have met with their Iranian counterparts in Tehran for the first time in six years, in order to improve maritime co-operation in the Strait of Hormuz.

In the aftermath of 2016 attack on the Saudi diplomatic missions in Iran, the United Arab Emirates had criticized Iran for not protecting Saudi diplomat missionary, however, unlike Saudi Arabia, Bahrain, and Qatar which withdrew its ambassadors, the United Arab Emirates maintains its diplomatic mission in the country, just limited its diplomatic relations.

In 2019, Iran-backed soldiers in Yemen fired a number of missiles at the UAE. One hit a bus at Abu Dhabi International Airport. They also claim another missile hit Dubai International Airport, but the UAE denied this.

Abraham accords 

Relations suffered a huge decline following the Israel–United Arab Emirates normalization agreement in August 2020. The Iranian government condemned the deal as a "dangerous" stab in the back of Palestinians and Muslims, and called it a "shameful" act of "strategic stupidity" by the UAE. Iran claimed that this would only serve to strengthen the "Axis of Resistance" in the Middle East, and that the Palestinians and people of the world would never forgive the UAE. Numerous threats from Iran were pointed against the United Arab Emirates following its effort to normalize relations with Israel.  In response, the UAE's Foreign Ministry summoned Iran's chargé d'affaires on 16 August and criticized Rouhani's speech as "unacceptable and inflammatory" which could impact the security scenario of the Gulf. It also stated that protecting the Emirati embassy in Tehran was Iran's duty.

The Chief of Staff of the Iranian armed forces Mohammad Bagheri meanwhile said that their strategy towards the UAE would now shift and the UAE would be held responsible in case of an attack on Iran through the Persian Gulf. The conservative newspaper Kayhan, whose editor-in-chief is appointed by the Supreme Leader of Iran, warned that the agreement had turned the UAE into a "legitimate, easy target".

Trade
Iranian businesses have a major presence in the UAE. Around 8,000 Iranian traders and trading firms are registered in the UAE, according to the local Iranian Business Council. Iranians are estimated to account for roughly 500,000 in UAE. Trade between Dubai and Iran tripled to $12 billion from 2005 to 2009. UAE's exports to Iran are four times greater than its imports from Iran.
The Iranian businesses in UAE own more than $300 billion there.

References

External link

 
United Arab Emirates
Iran